Roberta Serra (born 24 April 1970) is an Italian former alpine skier who competed in the 1994 Winter Olympics.

References

External links
 

1970 births
Living people
Italian female alpine skiers
Olympic alpine skiers of Italy
Alpine skiers at the 1994 Winter Olympics